Thomas Sales (5 September 1868–15 November 1926) was a Canadian politician and farmer. He was elected to the House of Commons of Canada in the 1921 election as a Member of the Progressive Party representing the riding of Saltcoats.

References 

1868 births
1926 deaths
People from Nottingham
English emigrants to Canada
Members of the House of Commons of Canada from Saskatchewan
Progressive Party of Canada MPs
Place of death missing